Grevillea pinaster is a species of flowering plant in the family Proteaceae and is endemic to the south-west of Western Australia. It is an erect shrub with linear leaves and pinkish-red to red flowers, the style with a yellowish tip.

Description
The upper surface is glabrous, the edges turned down or rolled under obscuring the lower surface. The end of the style is yellowish.

Taxonomy
Grevillea pinaster was first formally described by Carl Meissner in Hooker's Journal of Botany and Kew Garden Miscellany in 1855, from material collected by James Drummond. The specific epithet (pinaster) means "imitation pine".

Distribution and habitat
This grevillea grows in shrubland and heath, often near creeks, and mainly occurs between the Murchison River, Eneabba and Mullewa in the Avon Wheatbelt, Geraldton Sandplains and Swan Coastal Plain bioregions of south-western Western Australia.

Conservation status
Grevillea pinaster is listed as "not threatened" by the Government of Western Australia Department of Biodiversity, Conservation and Attractions.

Plants labelled as Grevillea stenomera in plant nurseries are often forms or hybrids of this species.

References

pinaster
Endemic flora of Western Australia
Eudicots of Western Australia
Proteales of Australia
Taxa named by Carl Meissner
Plants described in 1855